The Neutron is a dual oscillator subtractive monosynth manufactured by Behringer. Released in 2018, the Neutron has a fully analogue signal path. It is semi-modular, and is compatible with Eurorack voltages.

Release 
The Neutron was announced in January 2018 and was received well by critics. Priced around £300, a relatively low price point, critics highlighted how the Neutron packs in a lot of features for its cost. The Neutron's original design was seen as a welcome break for some due to Behringer's habit of cloning vintage synthesizers. However, criticism was made of the delay circuit, which bled into the signal path when muted.

Design 
The Neutron was designed in the United Kingdom by engineers at Midas. It has a red faceplate. It can be used as a desktop unit or taken out its casing to be used as a Eurorack module. The Neutron measures 3U by 80HP in Eurorack measurements. Control over the synthesizer comes with seven buttons and 36 knobs.

Oscillators 
The synthesizer has two oscillators based on the classic Curtis CEM3340, which powered popular synthesizers such as the Roland SH-101 and Sequential Circuits Prophet 5. Each chip has five blendable waveforms: sine, triangle, sawtooth, square and "tone mod", a waveshaping oscillator. There is oscillator sync, PWM and a noise source. A mix knob blends the mixture of both oscillators. External sounds can be run through the signal chain. The oscillator range can be changed using the "range" button. The full range of the oscillators is +/-10 octaves. The Neutron has a paraphonic mode to assign each oscillator to a separate note. There is "poly-chaining" functionality, letting you link multiple units together to play polyphonically.

Filter 
Neutron has a 2-pole multimode 12 dB/octave filter with resonance control. It has low-pass, band-pass and high-pass modes (using the patchbay, other filter shapes can be created). The filter can self-oscillate and has key-tracking. The filter was designed by Keith Moffat, head engineer at Midas.

Modulation 
There are several modulation sources on the Neutron, including an LFO, two envelopes and sample and hold. The LFO is bi-polar and has five blendable waveshapes: sine, triangle, sawtooth, square and ramp (reverse sawtooth). It can reach rates of 10 kHz for audio rate modulation. Neutron's two envelopes are ADSR. The Neutron also has a slew limiter and two attenuators.

Effects 
The Neutron has a bucket-brigade delay chip with control over time, mix and feedback. It also has an overdrive section with control over drive, level and tone.

Patchbay 
The Neutron's patchbay allows reconfiguration of the original signal path. It has 56 patch points in total, 32 inputs and 24 outputs.

Update 
The Neutron was updated in December 2018. The 2.0 firmware added keyboard splits, glide, pitch bend levels and other functions.

Impact 
In March 2022, Behringer announced the Proton. Similar to the Neutron, the Proton has the same oscillator section as the Neutron. However, the Proton includes substantially more modules, including two looping ASR envelopes, two LFOs (one more than the Neutron), another filter, a waveshaper and sub-oscillators. The Proton will have 64 patch points, eight more than the Neutron.

References 

Synthesizers